Two of Hearts is a 1999 romantic comedy television film directed by Harvey Frost. The plot centers on characters portrayed by Gail O'Grady and Rob Stewart; the two characters are losers who encounter each other at the wedding of their respective ex-spouses.

References

1999 romantic comedy films
1999 in Canadian television
1999 television films
1999 films
Canadian romantic comedy films
Canadian comedy television films
English-language Canadian films
Films shot in Vancouver
1990s English-language films
1990s Canadian films